Showgrounds railway station is a railway station on the Transperth network. It is located on the Fremantle line, 8.6 kilometres from Perth station adjacent to the Claremont Showground. It is used only when events are held at the Showground, such as the Royal Show.

History
The original Showgrounds station opened on 2 October 1954 on the north side of the Ashton Avenue road bridge. It consisted of two 180 metre platforms with free standing passenger shelters and small administration/storage rooms for staff operating the station during Perth Royal Show week. The construction was part of the conversion of Perth's passenger train system from steam to diesel power, allowing smaller intervals between stations.

The station closed on 1 September 1979 along with the rest of the Fremantle line, re-opening on 29 July 1983 when services were restored. In March 1994, construction of a new Showgrounds station 400 metres south commenced. It opened on 20 September 1995.

Services
Showgrounds station is served by Transperth Fremantle line services from Fremantle to Perth and Airport line services from Claremont to High Wycombe only during special events, such as the Perth Royal Show.

Showgrounds station saw 82,207 passengers in the 2013–14 financial year.

Platforms

Bus routes

References

External links
Gallery History of Western Australian Railways & Stations

Claremont, Western Australia
Fremantle line
Railway stations in Perth, Western Australia
Railway stations in Australia opened in 1954
Railway stations closed in 1995
Railway stations in Australia opened in 1995
Airport line, Perth